Shelbyville may refer to:

United States
 Shelbyville, Illinois
 Shelbyville, Indiana
 Shelbyville, Kentucky
 Shelbyville, Michigan
 Shelbyville, Missouri
 Shelbyville, Tennessee
 Shelbyville, Texas

Fictional
 Shelbyville (The Simpsons), a fictional city in the television series The Simpsons

See also 
Shelbyville Historic District (disambiguation)
 Shelby (disambiguation)